Avalon is an unincorporated community located in the Town of Bradford, Rock County, Wisconsin, United States. It is located along Wisconsin Highway 140 north of Clinton and south of Emerald Grove. Avalon is served by the Wisconsin and Southern Railroad.

References

Unincorporated communities in Wisconsin
Unincorporated communities in Rock County, Wisconsin